Kuyacha is a rural locality (a selo) and the administrative center of Kuyachinsky Selsoviet, Altaysky District, Altai Krai, Russia. The population was 465 as of 2013. There are 6 streets.

Geography 
Kuyacha is located 63 km southwest of Altayskoye (the district's administrative centre) by road. Kuyagan is the nearest rural locality.

References 

Rural localities in Altaysky District, Altai Krai